WKPQ (105.3 FM) is a radio station broadcasting a country music format. Licensed to Hornell, New York, United States, the station serves the Elmira-Corning area including the Canisteo valley and northern Pennsylvania.  The station is currently owned by Sound Communications, LLC. of Corning, NY.

History
The station signed on in 1946 as WWHG-FM, owned by the W.H. Greenhow Co who also owned the Hornell Tribune newspaper. In the era of AM radio it did not do well financially, so the mission became to procure an AM signal.  In 1949 WWHG began operation on 1590 with 500 Watts.  Very shortly thereafter, WLEA 1320 kHz went into bankruptcy and discontinued operations.  A Pennsylvania radio station operator, Cary Simpson, purchased the equipment, most of which was used to sign on WFRM-AM Coudersport, PA. The license was purchased by WWHG, moving WWHG to 1320 and turning in the 1590 License.  WLEA returned a year later under different ownership on 1480 kHz, where it is today.  WWHG AM-FM later became WHHO AM-FM, eventually bought by Bilbat Radio in 1983.  Renamed WKPQ, 105.3 began an Adult contemporary format; WHHO an MOR/variety format as before.

In the 1990s, the ownership became in flux as Bilbat sold the stations to two different entities, the Pfuntner group (Pembrook Pines Media Group) and Backyard Broadcasting.  Backyard soon retreated but Bilbat's legal battle continued with Pembrook continued.  Bilbat partner Richard C. Lyons (Bat) died in 2005 and eventually remaining partner Bill Berry was required to settle with Pembrook. In the meantime Pembrook had their own problems. The poor economy coupled with some poor decisions put Pembrook into a financial position unable to complete the Bilbat Sale, so Berry shut down WHHO and sold WKPQ to Sound Communications in 2011 (Vision would buy much of the rest of Pembrook in 2014).  Sound, in turn, sold all its broadcast assets to Standard Media in late 2019.
 
On October 10, 2011, WKPQ changed its format to country, branded as "Kickin' Country 105.3". Current programming schedule: Morning show, "Wakin' Up Kickin'" hosted by TJ Sharp (who moved to WBEE-FM Rochester in 2015), followed by mid-day personality Aaron Jackson.  Lee Richey, (PD/MD), hosts a noon hour request show, and then back on for the afternoon drive show.

In July 2021 WKPQ rebranded as "Bigfoot Country", simulcasting WCBF 96.1 FM Elmira.

References

External links

KPQ
Radio stations established in 1981
Hornell, New York